Lowell School District may refer to:
Lowell School District (Maine)
Lowell Area Schools (Michigan)
Lowell School District (Oregon)
Lowell Public Schools (Massachusetts)